Wonsey Rock is a small rock north of Cameron Island in the Swain Islands. This region was photographed by U.S. Navy Operation Highjump (1946–47), ANARE (Australian National Antarctic Research Expeditions) (1956), and the Soviet expedition (1956). It was included in a 1957 survey of the islands north of Wilkes Station by C.R. Eklund. He named the rock for construction mechanic Duane J. Wonsey, U.S. Navy, of the Wilkes Station party, 1957.

See also 
 Composite Antarctic Gazetteer
 List of Antarctic and sub-Antarctic islands
 List of Antarctic islands south of 60° S
 SCAR
 Territorial claims in Antarctica

References

External links 

Rock formations of Wilkes Land